Kevin van der Perren (born 6 August 1982) is a Belgian former competitive figure skater. He is the 2007 & 2009 European bronze medalist, a three-time Grand Prix medalist, and an eight-time (2000–2004, 2007, 2011, 2012) Belgian national champion. Van der Perren was the flagbearer for Belgium at the 2006 and 2010 Winter Olympics.

Personal life 
Kevin van der Perren was born on 6 August 1982 in Ninove, Belgium. He married British skater Jenna McCorkell on 17 May 2008. The couple lives in Coleraine, Northern Ireland and have a son named Ben, born in 2019.

Career 

Van der Perren became interested in figure skating after a traveling ice show came to his town to perform. Although his parents wanted him to play soccer and he was teased by his classmates at school, he refused to give up his dream of being an elite figure skater.

2001–02 to 2004–05 
Making his first Olympic appearance, van der Perren finished 12th at the 2002 Winter Olympics in Salt Lake City, Utah. At the 2002 World Junior Championships, he won the silver medal and also became the first skater to land a three jump combination, consisting of a 3S-3T-3L. He included this combination in his free program until the end of the 2003–04 season.

2005–06 season 
In November 2005, van der Perren sustained a back injury. He was the flagbearer for Belgium at the 2006 Winter Olympics in Turin, Italy, where he finished 9th. He withdrew from the 2006 World Championships due to a hip injury he sustained after the Olympics.

2006–07 season: First European bronze medal 
Van der Perren considered not going to the 2007 European Championships, but in the end he participated and finished on the podium, after edging Sergei Davydov by 0.07 for the bronze. This made him the first Belgian singles skater to win a medal at Europeans since 1947. He missed the 2007 World Championships after re-injuring his back a week before the event when he slipped on back crossovers and fell into a barrier. He trained in Belgium and also Coventry, England, due to ice being expensive in his native country.

2007–08 season 
In the 2007–08 season, van der Perren was assigned to the 2007 Skate Canada and the 2007 Trophée Eric Bompard as his Grand Prix events. He finished second at Skate Canada, where he won the free skate, and fourth at Trophee Eric Bompard, qualifying him for the Grand Prix Final. He then finished 6th at the Grand Prix Final and 5th at Europeans. At the 2008 Worlds, van der Perren finished 9th in the SP and 3rd in the LP for 6th place overall. He underwent hip surgery shortly afterward.

2008–09 season: Second European bronze medal 
Van der Perren returned to competition at the start of the 2008–09 season. After being forced to withdraw from two events, he finished 5th at the 2008 Cup of Russia. Despite skating with a painful hip injury, Van der Perren won the bronze medal at the 2009 European Championships, his second medal at Europeans.

2009–10 season 
In the 2009–10 season, van der Perren competed at the Finlandia Trophy where he took a hard fall on his injured hip but completed the competition. He finished 11th at the European Championships. He was the flagbearer for Belgium at the 2010 Winter Olympics in Vancouver, Canada. He finished 17th at his third Olympics. At the 2010 World Championships, he finished 8th after a free skate in which he landed a 4T-3T-3T combination; he was the first skater ever to have performed this in competition. Van der Perren later said that he had never done this combination followed by a 3A in practice, and that he had skated in honor of his grandfather, who died the night before the free skate.

2010–11 season 
Although he had considered retirement following the 2009–10 season, van der Perren decided to continue through the 2011 European Championships, where he finished 4th. He decided to change coaches from Yuri Bureiko to Sylvie De Rijcke and continue on. He competed at the 2011 World Championships, where he finished in 17th place.

2011–12 season 
Van der Perren won the silver medal at the 2011 Skate America after finishing first in the free skating, equaling his best showing on the Grand Prix circuit. It was the third Grand Prix medal of his career. He stated that the 2012 European Championships would be his final event. He was forced to withdraw from the 2012 Europeans prior to the free skating due to a wrist injury. Van der Perren later announced via his website that the injury was not a fracture but a ligament strain, and that he hoped to be able to compete at the 2012 World Championships in Nice, France. He finished 15th at the World Championships after placing 18th in the short program and 10th in the free skate, for which he received a standing ovation. He then retired from competition.

Post-competitive career 
Van der Perren is a full-time coach in Belgium as well as running a skating show, Ice Fantillusion, with his wife. In September 2012, van der Perren said that he was discussing training in pair skating.

In October 2012, van der Perren began training for the 5th edition of Sterren Op De Dansvloer (Belgium's Dancing with the Stars) with partner Charissa van Dipte and debuted on the show in November. In January 2013, they were named as the champions.

Jumping ability 
Van der Perren is the first Belgian skater to land a quadruple jump (toe loop) in competition, and the first skater ever to have done a 4T-3T-3T combination in competition. At the 2005 World Championships, he completed a 3F-3T-3Lo combination in his free program, although he touched down with his hand on the final jump. Van der Perren landed the combination again at the 2008 Worlds, this time with no touchdown.

Programs

Competitive highlights

GP: Grand Prix; JGP: Junior Grand Prix

References

External links

 
 

1982 births
Living people
People from Ninove
Belgian male single skaters
Figure skaters at the 2002 Winter Olympics
Figure skaters at the 2006 Winter Olympics
Figure skaters at the 2010 Winter Olympics
Olympic figure skaters of Belgium
European Figure Skating Championships medalists
World Junior Figure Skating Championships medalists
Sportspeople from East Flanders